Tabea Dalliard (born 18 July 1994) is a Swiss volleyball player. She is a member of the Women's National Team.
She participated at the 2013 Women's European Volleyball Championship, and 2017 Montreux Volley Masters.
She played for Point Park University.
She plays for Viteos NUC.

Clubs 
  Viteos Neuchatel Université 2016-2019
  Viteos NUC (2017–)

References

External links 
 FIVB Profile
 CEV profile

1994 births
Living people
Swiss women's volleyball players
Place of birth missing (living people)
Point Park University alumni